Mauro Di Francesco (born 17 May 1951) is an Italian actor, comedian and television personality.

Life and career 
Born  in Milan, Di Francesco started his career in the mid-1960s as a child actor appearing in some RAI miniseries. In the 1970s, he started performing as a comedian at the Derby Club, a cabaret nightclub in his hometown.  In the 1980s, after appearing as a sidekick of Diego Abatantuono in a number of films, he had the peak of his career starring in a number of teen comedies. Also active  on stage and on television, following an alcohol abuse problem in 2011 Di Francesco underwent a liver transplant.

Selected filmography 
 I fichissimi (1981)
 Il paramedico (1982)
 An Ideal Adventure (1982)
 Scusa se è poco (1982)
 Sapore di mare 2 - Un anno dopo (1983)
 Il ras del quartiere (1983)
 Summer Games (1984)
 Chewingum (1984)
 The Barber of Rio (1996)
 Gli inaffidabili (1997)
 Really SSSupercool: Chapter Two  (2006)
 Odissea nell'ospizio (2019)

References

External links 
 
 

1951 births
20th-century Italian male actors
21st-century Italian male actors
Italian male film actors
Italian male television actors
Italian male stage actors
Male actors from Milan
Living people
Mass media people from Milan